The United Arab Emirates has an embassy in Kuwait City, and Kuwait maintains an embassy in Abu Dhabi and a consulate-general in Dubai. Both countries are part of the Gulf Cooperation Council, Arab world, and Middle East region and share close cultural ties.

Diplomatic Relations

Gulf war

Following the invasion of Kuwait, the United Arab Emirates condemned the Iraqi aggression, supported Kuwaiti independence and rapidly opened all of its airports for coalition use. Additionally, ports and shipyards facilities in the UAE were made available for the deployment of coalition forces. The UAE Armed Forces participated in the coalition with an army battalion along with a squadron of Dassault Mirage 5 and Mirage 2000. 6 Emirati troops were killed in action.

See also
 Foreign relations of Kuwait
 Foreign relations of the United Arab Emirates

References

 
United Arab Emirates
Bilateral relations of the United Arab Emirates